is a multi-purpose stadium in Higashi-ku, Kumamoto, Japan.  It is currently used mostly for association football matches – it is home to  club Roasso Kumamoto – and sometimes for Top League rugby games. The stadium holds 32,000 people.

With Rosso's promotion from the Japan Football League to the J. League Division 2 in 2007, KKWing is expected to play a role in Rosso's ascendancy.

The stadium was used for the 2019 Rugby World Cup, the first Rugby World Cup to be held in Asia.

2019 Rugby World Cup

See also
Park Dome Kumamoto

References

External links
KKWing website 

Football venues in Japan
Rugby union stadiums in Japan
Athletics (track and field) venues in Japan
Buildings and structures in Kumamoto
Multi-purpose stadiums in Japan
Roasso Kumamoto
Sports venues in Kumamoto Prefecture
1998 establishments in Japan
Sports venues completed in 1998